Ma Quan (dates unknown), courtesy name Jiangxiang, was a Qing painter who lived during the late 17th–18th centuries, specialising in bird and flower painting. As a female artist who sold her paintings, Ma's art style is markedly different from both that of the imperial court and contemporary "talented young ladies".

Biography
Little information exists on Ma Quan's life, but sources suggest that she was born in Changshu and was either the daughter or granddaughter of the artist-scholar Ma Yuanyu. In later life, Ma suffered from blindness, and her students' paintings were sold with her signature.

She made bird and flower paintings to sell when she and her husband encountered financial difficulties. Gradually, her paintings became so popular that other people prepared the paint for her to allow her to make more works faster. In her later years, she was compared favourably to Ming dynasty artists like Shen Zhou, and many people in Changshu, particularly women, sought her out to request tuition, including an artist who would later gain fame, Jiang Lixi.

Art
Ma's subjects include butterflies, bees, and dragonflies, with modern critics identifying her brushwork as very controlled producing particularly fine strokes. She mainly painted flowers and birds seen in an ordinary garden, contrasting with the paintings of the imperial court. To one painting of chrysanthemums, Ma added a poem about how she has no place to plant such flowers but can tend them with her brush.  In comparison with Ma Yuanyu, Ma Quan's works have been described as similarly realist, but capable of conveying an aesthetic essence. The later Qing artist Tai Zuyong described her paintings as having alluring brushwork of serene interest. Ma was strongly influenced by Song dynasty art styles, which she expresses in her frequent tags that an image had been painted in the "style of the Song".

Ma's paintings have been compared with those of Yun Bing, another female artist in the Jiangsu region and the aunt of Yun Zhu. Whilst Yun was known for her skill in painting subjects without outlines, Ma was skilled at creating paintings with defined silhouettes.

Gallery

References

Bibliography

See also

Yun Zhu

Year of birth unknown
Year of death unknown
Painters from Suzhou
Qing dynasty landscape painters
Qing dynasty calligraphers
18th-century Chinese painters
Chinese women painters
18th-century Chinese women artists